was a general in the Imperial Japanese Army and very briefly Army Minister in the 1930s.

Biography
Nakamura was a native of Ishikawa Prefecture. He was educated in military preparatory schools from early youth, and graduated from the 13th class of the Imperial Japanese Army Academy in 1901, and from the 21st class of the Army Staff College in 1909, where his classmates included Hisaichi Terauchi and Yoshijirō Umezu.

Nakamura served in various administrative and staff positions within the Imperial Japanese Army General Staff for almost his entire career. He was sent as a military attaché to Sweden from 1920 to 1921.

After his promotion to lieutenant colonel, Nakamura was assigned command of the IJA 67th Infantry Regiment from 1922 to 1923. He returned to the General Staff from 1923 to 1927. In 1927, Nakamura was promoted to major general and commanded the IJA 39th Infantry Brigade. From 1929 to 1930, he was the Chief of Staff of the Chosen Army in Korea.

Nakamura served as Chief of the Personnel Bureau in the General Staff from 1930 to 1932. He returned to the field as the commander of the Japanese China Garrison Army in 1932, and was shortly thereafter promoted to lieutenant general. In 1934, Nakamura became commander of the 8th Army. He was recalled to Tokyo in December 1935 to serve as Deputy Inspector-General of Military Training.

From 2 to 7 February 1937, Nakamura became Army Minister for a brief seven-day stint under Prime Minister Senjūrō Hayashi.

Afterwards, Nakamura was appointed commander of the Eastern District Army, and was promoted to full general in 1938. Nakamura then became commander of the Chosen Army from 1938 to 1941.

From 1941 until his retirement due to poor health in 1943, Nakamura served as a member of the Supreme War Council. Nakamura died shortly after the end of World War II on 29 August 1947.

References

Books

External links

Notes

 
|-

1881 births
1947 deaths
Military personnel from Ishikawa Prefecture
Japanese generals
Ministers of the Imperial Japanese Army